Miles Platting railway station served the district of Miles Platting in Manchester from 1844 until closure on 27 May 1995. The station was opened on 1 January 1844 by the Manchester and Leeds Railway; after amalgamating with other railways, this became the Lancashire and Yorkshire Railway in 1847. Little trace remains of the station today, as the platforms were removed and the buildings demolished after closure. However, a length of platform awning has been re-erected at Ramsbottom station on the preserved East Lancs Railway.

References 

Disused railway stations in Manchester
Former Lancashire and Yorkshire Railway stations
Railway stations in Great Britain opened in 1844
Railway stations in Great Britain closed in 1995